Hochman is a surname. Notable people with the surname include:

Calvin Hoffman (1906–1986), American theater press agent and writer 
Dayan Hochman-Vigil, American attorney and member of the New Mexico House of Representatives
Gilad Hochman (born 1982), Israeli classical music composer
Henryk Hochman (c. 1879–1943), Polish Jewish sculptor
Israel J. Hochman (c. 1875-1940), American klezmer musician
Larry Hochman (born 1953), American orchestrator and composer
Nathan Hochman (born 1963), American lawyer
Sandra Hochman (born 1936), American poet, novelist, and documentary film maker
Stan Hochman (1928–2015), American sportswriter
Stanley Hochman (1924–2014), American editor and translator

See also
Hoffman (disambiguation)